Adrian High School is a public high school in Adrian, Oregon, United States. It enrolls about 97 students and is a part of the Adrian School District.  the current principal is Kevin Purnell.

Athletics
The Adrian Antelopes compete in the  OSAA High Desert League 1A-8. The school colors are green and yellow.

External links
 Adrian HS website

References

High schools in Malheur County, Oregon
Public high schools in Oregon